The Trust Golf Asian Mixed Series is a golf competition held jointly on the Asian Tour and Ladies European Tour (LET), played in Pattaya, Thailand.

The inaugural two events in 2022 are played back-to-back on the Waterside Course at Siam Country Club, home of the Honda LPGA Thailand, between 7 and 16 April.

The 2022 Mixed Cup winner; Ratchanon Chantananuwat became the youngest male winner on a major tour, at 15 years and 37 days.

Format
Both events feature 60 LET players and 60 Asian Tour players, along with 24 sponsor invitations, playing for the same prize fund and trophy. 
Each tournament will offer a prize fund of US$750,000, along with Official World Golf Ranking points. Order of Merit points will be awarded to players from both tours respectively.

Asian Mixed Cup

Winners

Asian Mixed Stableford Challenge

Winners

See also
Scandinavian Mixed

Notes

References

External links
Asian Tour's official site
Ladies European Tour's official site

Asian Tour events
Ladies European Tour events
Golf tournaments in Thailand
Mixed sports competitions